State Center may refer to:
 State Center, Iowa, a city in Marshall County
 Iowa State Center, a cultural and athletic complex in Ames, Iowa
 State Center (Metro Subway station), a station in Baltimore, Maryland
 State Center Community College District, an education district in California

See also
List of geographic centers of the United States